Hello! Stranger is a 2014 South Korean television program starring Kim Kwang-kyu, Julien Kang, Kangnam and Mina Fujii. It airs on MBC on Wednesday at 23:15 beginning October 16, 2014.

Cast

References

External links
 

2014 South Korean television series debuts
2015 South Korean television series endings
Korean-language television shows
South Korean reality television series
South Korean variety television shows
MBC TV original programming
Multiculturalism in South Korea